Nadia de Santiago Capell (born 3 January 1990) is a Spanish actress. She appeared in more than thirty films since 2001. In 2007, she was nominated for the Goya Award for Best New Actress for her performance in Las 13 rosas.

Selected filmography

Films

TV series

TV films

References

External links
 

1990 births
Living people
Actresses from Madrid
Spanish film actresses
Spanish television actresses
21st-century Spanish actresses